Lukáš Zátopek (born 2 February 1978) is a Czech ice hockey player currently playing for Chelmsford Chieftains of the English National Ice Hockey League.

He began his career in 1998 with HC Vítkovice in the Czech Extraliga, the top level of hockey in the Czech Republic, where he stayed until 2001. In 2001 he moved to Heilbronn Falcons in Germany. He eventually moved to Slovakia, to play for MHC Nitra. In 2008 he moved from Germany to England to play for the Milton Keynes Lightning. in the English Premier Ice Hockey League.

During his career he has played for HC Vitkovice, Heilbronn Falcons, HC Prostejov, HC Havirov Panthers, HC Prerov, DHK Latgale and ESC Halle 04 before eventually joining his current club Milton Keynes Lightning.

Career statistics

References

1978 births
Living people
People from Havířov
HC Vítkovice players
Milton Keynes Lightning players
Chelmsford Chieftains players
Czech ice hockey defencemen
Saale Bulls Halle players
Sportspeople from the Moravian-Silesian Region
HC Slezan Opava players
HC Prostějov players
HK Nitra players
Czech expatriate ice hockey players in Slovakia
Czech expatriate ice hockey players in Germany
Czech expatriate sportspeople in Latvia
Czech expatriate sportspeople in England
Expatriate ice hockey players in England
Expatriate ice hockey players in Latvia